Ellenville Downtown Historic District is a national historic district located at Ellenville, Ulster County, New York. It encompasses 52 contributing buildings and 3 contributing sites in the central business district of Ellenville.  It developed after 1823, with the construction of the Delaware and Hudson Canal, and includes notable examples of Greek Revival, Italianate, Late Victorian, and Art Deco architecture. Located in the district are the separately listed Christ Lutheran Church and Parsonage, George and John R. Hunt Memorial Building, and United States Post Office.  Other notable contributing resources include the Ellenville United Methodist Church (1858), First National Bank Building (1868), Wawarsing Town Hall (1895), Norbury Hall, Scoresby Hook and Ladder, Cohen's Bakery, Ellenville Electric Co. Building (1914), Home National Bank (1928), H. Rosenstock and Sons clothing factory (c. 1920), the Miller Building (c. 1940), and the Village Motel (c. 1955).

It was listed on the National Register of Historic Places in 2012.

References

Historic districts on the National Register of Historic Places in New York (state)
Greek Revival architecture in New York (state)
Victorian architecture in New York (state)
Italianate architecture in New York (state)
Art Deco architecture in New York (state)
Historic districts in Ulster County, New York
National Register of Historic Places in Ulster County, New York